Angelica or Angiola Veronica Airola (c. 1590 – 1670) was an Italian painter of the Baroque period, active mainly in 17th century Genoa. She was a pupil of the painter Domenico Fiasella. She became a nun of the order of San Bartolommeo dell' Oliveta at Genoa. She painted several works, mainly religious, while in the convent.

References
 
 

 

1590s births
1670 deaths
17th-century Italian painters
Painters from Genoa
Italian Baroque painters
Italian women painters
16th-century Italian women artists
Catholic painters
Female Catholic artists